Aída Alberti (13 November 1915 – 18 April 2006) was an Argentine film actress of the 1940s and 1950s.

Filmography
  (1938)
  (1939)
  (1939)
  (1939)
  (1940)
  (1940)
  (1940)
  (1940)
 The Song of the Suburbs (1941)
 The Gaucho Priest (1941)
  (1942)
  (1942)
  (1942)
  (1943)
  (1944)
  (1945)
  (1945)
  (1946)
 Women's Refuge (1946)
  (1947)
 Modern Husbands (1948)
  (1949)
  (1951)
  (1951)
  (1951)
 Emergency Ward (1952)

External links
 

1915 births
Argentine film actresses
Argentine stage actresses
Argentine television actresses
20th-century Argentine actresses
2006 deaths
Place of death missing
Burials at La Chacarita Cemetery